John D. Weibel (March 13, 1904 – February 17, 1931) was a college football player and coach and medical doctor.

College football

Playing

Notre Dame
At Notre Dame, Weibel was one of the "Seven mules" (left guard) who blocked for the Four Horsemen.

Coaching

Vanderbilt
Weibel was assistant grid coach and scout under Dan McGugin for 2 years at Vanderbilt while also attending Vanderbilt Medical School.

Duquesne
Starting in September 1927, Weibel was first assistant and line coach at Duquesne under fellow Notre Dame teammate and 4 horseman Elmer Layden while completing his medical internship at Mercy Hospital in Pittsburgh.

Death
He died February 17, 1931, in Pittsburgh from peritonitis after contracting appendicitis. Notre Dame coach Knute Rockne "often said Weibel was one of the principal factors in the success of the 'Horseman.'"

References

External links

1904 births
1931 deaths
American football guards
Physicians from Pennsylvania
Duquesne Dukes football coaches
Notre Dame Fighting Irish football players
Vanderbilt Commodores football coaches
Vanderbilt University School of Medicine alumni
Sportspeople from Erie, Pennsylvania
Players of American football from Pennsylvania